Gesellschaft is one of the categories used by the German sociologist Ferdinand Tönnies to categorize social ties.

Gesellschaft may also refer to:
 Die Gesellschaft (literary magazine), a literary magazine published 1885–1902 by Michael Georg Conrad
 Die Gesellschaft (series), a series of monographs published 1906–1912 by Martin Buber
 Die Gesellschaft (political magazine), a 1924–1933 political journal, successor of Die Neue Zeit
 Gesellschaft, a company in German company law